The following is a list of presidents of UEFA, the European association football governing body.

Presidents of UEFA

Notes
 Jacques Georges served as interim president before being elected on 26 June 1984.
 The title of Honorary President was conferred to Jacques Georges upon leaving office until his death in 2004.
 The title of Honorary President was conferred to Lennart Johansson upon leaving office until his death in 2019.

See also
List of association football competitions
List of presidents of FIFA
List of presidents of AFC
List of presidents of CAF
List of presidents of CONCACAF
List of presidents of CONMEBOL
List of presidents of OFC

Notes

References

External links
UEFA – Past presidents

 
Presidents of UEFA
UEFA